Dener Augusto de Sousa (2 April 1971 — 18 April 1994), known simply as Dener, was a Brazilian footballer who played as a forward. He played twice for the Brazil national team.

Club career

Youth
Born in São Paulo, Dener started his career at São Paulo FC's youth squad, in 1988, but after just two months he moved to Portuguesa's youth squad. In 1991, playing for Portuguesa, he won the Copa São Paulo de Juniores, and was elected the competition's best player.

Professional
In 1989, he was promoted to Portuguesa's first team squad, where he stayed until 1993, playing 47 Campeonato Brasileiro Série A matches, and scoring seven goals. In 1993, Corinthians failed to sign him, and then he was loaned to Grêmio of Porto Alegre, where he won the Rio Grande do Sul State Championship, and played four Copa do Brasil matches in that year. In the following year he was loaned to Vasco of Rio de Janeiro, where he played two Copa do Brasil matches and scored a goal, and posthumously won the Rio de Janeiro State Championship.

International career
Dener played two matches for the Brazil national team, managed by Paulo Roberto Falcão. On March 27, 1991, he played against Argentina, and two months later, on May 28, he played against Bulgaria.

Death
On 18 April 1994, in Rio de Janeiro, Dener died in a car accident, when his Mitsubishi Eclipse, crashed into a tree at Borges de Medeiros Avenue, in the Lagoa Rodrigo de Freitas district. The car's driver was Dener's friend, Oto Gomes de Miranda, who lost both legs in the accident. Dener was strangled by the car's seat belt.

Career statistics

Club

International

Honours
Portuguesa
Copa São Paulo de Futebol Júnior: 1991

Grêmio
Campeonato Gaúcho: 1993

Vasco da Gama
Campeonato Carioca: 1994

References

External links
 Dener profile at the Brazilian FA database

1971 births
1994 deaths
Footballers from São Paulo
Road incident deaths in Brazil
Brazilian footballers
Brazil international footballers
Grêmio Foot-Ball Porto Alegrense players
Associação Portuguesa de Desportos players
CR Vasco da Gama players
Association football forwards
Association football midfielders
Deaths by strangulation